Yavuz is a common masculine Turkish given name and in Turkish, "Yavuz" means "inflexible", "resolute" and "ferocious".

Etymology
Old Turkic intervocalic or stem-final b, represented by bilabial w in Karakhanid and Khorezmian, is changed to v. Thus Yavuz comes from Old Turkic: yabïz (𐰖𐰉𐰕), Old Uyghur:  yabīz or yawīz, Khorerzmian: yawuz meaning "bad, vile".

Given name
 Selim I (1465–1520), nicknamed Yavuz, Sultan of the Ottoman Empire
 Yavuz Ağralı (born 1992), Turkish long-distance runner
 Yavuz Ali Pasha (fl. 1601–1604), Ottoman statesman
 Yavuz Ataç, Turkish intelligence official
 Yavuz Çetin (1970–2001), Turkish musician
 Yavuz Eraydın (born 1976), Turkish footballer
 Yavuz Bingöl (born 1964), Turkish actor
 Yavuz Görey (1912-1995), Turkish sculptor
 Yavuz İlnam (born 1987), Turkish trap shooter
 Yavuz Karamollaoğlu (born 1980), Turkish karate practitioner
 Yavuz Mildon (born 1955), Turkish politician
 Yavuz Özkan (director) (born 1942), Turkish film director
 Yavuz Özkan (footballer) (born 1985), Turkish footballer
 Yavuz Şimşek (born 1947), Turkish footballer
 Yavuz Tatış (born 1947), Turkish businessman
 Yavuz Turgul (born 1946), Turkish film director and screenwriter
 Yavuz Yapıcıoğlu (born 1967), Turkish serial killer

Surname
 Birsen Yavuz (born 1980), Turkish sprinter
 Burak Yavuz (born 1975), Turkish volleyball player
 Ece Yağmur Yavuz (born 2004), Turkish female artistic gymnast
 Erdinç Yavuz (born 1978), Turkish footballer
 İbrahim Yavuz (born 1982), Turkish footballer
 Mahmut Yavuz (born 1982), Turkish navy officer and ultramarathon runner
 Yüksel Yavuz (born 1964), Turkish-born Kurdish film director
 Jay-Jay Okocha has surname Yavuz in his Turkish passport

See also
 Yavuz (battleship)
 Yavuz (drillship)

References

Turkish-language surnames
Turkish masculine given names